Raja Nipal Chand was a member of a Rajput clan. He embraced Islam and took name Naru shah (Naru khan). The Naru clan was named after him.

Naru: The Narus of Hoshiarpur District claim that their ancestor was a Suryavanshi Rajput of Muttra, named Nipal Chand, and descended from Raja Ram Chand. He was converted in the time of Mahmud of Ghazni and took the name of Naru Shah.

Naru Shah settled at Mau in Jalandhar, where his son, Ratan Pal, founded Phillaur, and founded the four Naru parganas of Haryana, Bajwara, Sham Chaurasi and Ghorewaha in Hoshiarpur, and that of Bahram in Jullunder. The chief men of these parganas are still called Rai or Rana. Some kept Brahmans of the Baadeo got.

See also
List of Rajputs

References

Year of birth missing
Year of death missing